State Route 201 (SR 201) is a  state highway in the northwestern part of the U.S. state of Georgia. It travels from Villanow, in Walker County northeast to Varnell, in Whitfield County.

Route description

SR 201 begins at an intersection with SR 136 in Villanow. It heads north-northeast, through portions of the Chattahoochee-Oconee National Forest, until it enters Whitfield County. The highway continues to the north-northeast, and travels through the unincorporated community of Mt. Vernon. Shortly afterward, SR 201 travels past the western edge of Rocky Face. There, it intersects US 41/US 76/SR 3 (Chattanooga Road), and the four highways travel concurrently north to Tunnel Hill, where SR 201 departs to the northeast, while US 41/US 76/SR 3 continue on Chattanooga Road. Just past the northeastern edge of Tunnel Hill is an interchange with Interstate 75 (I-75; Larry McDonald Memorial Highway). SR 201 continues heading northeast until it meets its northern terminus, an intersection with SR 2 in Varnell.

SR 201 is not part of the National Highway System, a system of roadways important to the nation's economy, defense, and mobility.

History
The roadway that would eventually become SR 201 was established between 1926 and the end of 1929 as part of SR 2, but on a slightly different path, from Villanow to Dalton. The next year, this segment's northern end was shifted to the northwest to travel from Villanow to US 41/SR 3 in Tunnel Hill. Its southern part was under construction. By the end of 1931, the southern part had completed grading, but no surface course, while the northern part was under construction. In February 1932, the southern end was shifted slightly to the west. In July of the next year, this entire segment of SR 2 had a "sand clay or top soil" surface. Around the middle of 1934, the entire segment had a "completed semi hard surface". At the beginning of 1940, SR 158 was established from US 41/SR 3 in Tunnel Hill to SR 71 in Varnell. Later that year, the Whitfield County portion of the Villanow–Tunnel Hill segment of SR 2 had a "completed hard surface". At the end of 1941, the entire length of SR 158 was redesignated as part of SR 201. By the end of 1946, SR 2 in Tunnel Hill was shifted back to Dalton, with the entire segment from Villanow to Dalton hard surfaced. By the beginning of 1948, all of SR 201 at the time, except for its northern terminus, had a "sand clay, top soil, or stabilized earth" surface. Its northern terminus was hard surfaced. The next year, SR 2 was shifted north. Its segment northeast of Villanow was redesignated as a southern extension of SR 201. The highway's northern segment was replaced by SR 2's new routing, thereby truncationg it to the western part of Varnell. In 1953, the segment from Tunnel Hill–Varnell was hard surfaced.

Major junctions

See also

References

External links

 Georgia Roads (Routes 201 - 220)
 Georgia State Route 201 on State-Ends.com

201
Transportation in Walker County, Georgia
Transportation in Whitfield County, Georgia